Amarapura District is the district of Mandalay Region, Myanmar. Partly included under Mandalay City Development Committee and Mandalay. Its principal town is Amarapura.Amarapura District have only one township. So, Amarapura District is also Amarapura Township.


Townships

The townships, cities, towns that are included in Amarapura District are as follows:
Amarapura Township 
Amarapura
Myitnge

History
On April 30, 2022, new districts were expanded and organized. Amarapura Township from Mandalay District was promoted as a district.

References

Districts of Myanmar
Mandalay Region